Međurečje may refer to:

 Međurečje (Ivanjica), a village in the municipality of Ivanjica, Serbia
 Međurečje (Kraljevo), a village in the municipality of Kraljevo, Serbia
 Međurečje (Rudo), a village in the municipality of Rudo, Republika Srpska, Bosnia and Herzegovina

or:
 Međureč, old name Međurečje, today village in the municipality of Jagodina, Serbia

See also 
 Međurječje, a village in the municipality of Čajniče, Republika Srpska, Bosnia and Herzegovina
 Međureč (disambiguation)